Sutherland Macdonald was a prominent English tattoo artist in the late 19th century and early 20th century, and the first tattooist in Britain with an identifiable premises open to the public. Operating in a salon in London's Jermyn Street, he is listed in the 1894 London Post Office Directory. He is considered the first person to offer a professional tattoo service in London, although the practice was already popular in Japan and the Middle East prior to that time. He was said to have tattooed "kings" and "princes", including George V when he was Duke of York.

Career
Macdonald served in the British Army in the 1870s as a telegraph operator in the Royal Engineers and was in the Anglo-Zulu War.

In addition to artistic designs, he also performed color blending on skin grafts of accident victims.

He died at his home on 3 Guilford Avenue, Surbiton and is buried at Surbiton Cemetery.

Legacy 
On January 29, 2016, the Museum of London opened a display which included some of his work called Tattoo London.

See also 

 George Burchett
 Tom Riley

References

1860 births
1942 deaths
British Army personnel of the Anglo-Zulu War
British tattoo artists
Artists from Leeds
People from Surbiton
Royal Engineers soldiers
Military personnel from Leeds
19th-century British Army personnel